My Brother's Gun is a 1997 Spanish film directed and written by Ray Loriga in his feature-length directorial debut. It stars Daniel González, Nico Bidásolo and Andrés Gertrúdix, with Anna Galiena, Karra Elejalde, Viggo Mortensen, and Christina Rosenvinge in supporting roles.

Plot 
After shooting and killing a security guard in a mall, a young man flees alongside a girl who has just attempted suicide.

Cast

Production 
The film is an adaptation of Loriga's novel Caídos del cielo as well as the Generation X novelist's debut feature; Loriga had previously been involved in the film industry in the writing of Live Flesh. The film was produced by Enrique Cerezo, and it had the participation/collaboration of TVE and Canal+.

Release 
The film was presented at the 42nd Valladolid International Film Festival (Seminci) in October 1997. Distributed by United International Pictures, the film was theatrically released in Spain on 14 November 1997.

Reception  
Jonathan Holland of Variety deemed the "languid Hispanic reprise of pics such as Kalifornia and Natural Born Killers" to feature "considerably more style than substance" despite being "beautifully shot and edited".

Ángel Fernández-Santos of El País considered that despite featuring a "lively and rich narrative material", Loriga deals with it "clumsily", as the helmer rushed into a "reckless journey from literary to cinematographic language, without mastering the articulations of the latter".

See also 
 List of Spanish films of 1997

References 

Films based on Spanish novels
1997 drama films
1990s Spanish-language films
1990s Spanish films
Enrique Cerezo PC films